In human anatomy, the transverse colon is the longest and most movable part of the colon.

Anatomical position
It crosses the abdomen from the ascending colon at the right colic flexure (hepatic flexure) with a downward convexity to the descending colon where it curves sharply on itself beneath the lower end of the spleen forming the left colic flexure (splenic flexure).
In its course, it describes an arch, the concavity of which is directed backward and a little upward. Toward its splenic end there is often an abrupt U-shaped curve which may descend lower than the main curve.

It is almost completely invested by the peritoneum, and is connected to the inferior border of the pancreas by a large and wide duplicature of that membrane, the transverse mesocolon.

It is in relation, by its upper surface, with the liver and gall-bladder, the greater curvature of the stomach, and the lower end of the spleen; by its under surface, with the small intestine; by its anterior surface, with the posterior layer of the greater omentum and the abdominal wall; its posterior surface is in relation from right to left with the descending portion of the duodenum, the head of the pancreas, and some of the convolutions of the jejunum and ileum.

Function
The transverse colon absorbs water and salts.

Additional images

See also
 Colon

References

External links
  - "The large intestine."

Large intestine